The Lancashire Plate was a flat horse race in Great Britain open to Thoroughbreds aged two years and over. It was run over seven furlongs at Manchester Racecourse in September from 1888 to 1893. It was one of the most valuable races in the country and its winners included Classic victors Seabreeze, Donovan and La Fleche.

History
The Lancashire Plate was first run on 22 September 1888 over seven furlongs at Manchester Racecourse. The prize money was made up of £11,000 added to a sweepstakes of £20 each. The weights were 7 st 5 lb for two-year-olds, 9 st 3 lb for three-year-olds and 9 st 9 lb for four-year-olds, with mares and geldings being allowed to carry 3 lb less. Horses that had won more than £1,000 (excluding handicaps) once had to carry a 4 lb penalty and winners of either £1,000 once or £2,000 twice had to carry a 7 lb penalty. Any horse who had won the 2000 Guineas, Derby or St. Leger had to carry an extra 10 lb. The purse was increased to £12,000 in 1889, but reduced back to £11,000 in 1890, when the subscription was reduced to £5. In 1892 the distance of the race was increased to one mile and the purse was reduced to 10,000 The prize money was reduced again to £8,000 in 1892. The Lancashire Plate was last run in 1893 and the following season was replaced by the Prince Edward Handicap worth £2,000.

Records
Most successful horse:
 no horse won this race more than once
Leading jockey:
 no jockey won this race more than once
Leading owner (2 wins):
 6th Duke of Portland – Donovan (1889), Raeburn (1893)
Fastest winning time (7 furlongs) – Seabreeze (1888), 1m 29.4s

Fastest winning time (1 mile) – Raeburn (1893), 1m 48.6s

Widest winning margin – La Fleche (1892), 3 lengths

Shortest winning margin – Signorina (1891), ½ length

Longest odds winner – Signorina (1891), 6/1

Shortest odds winner – Donovan (1889), 4/6

Most runners – 24 (1888)

Fewest runners – 4 (1893)

Winners

See also
 Horseracing in Great Britain
 List of British flat horse races

References

Flat races in Great Britain
Discontinued horse races
Recurring sporting events established in 1888